The Central District of Divandarreh County is a district (bakhsh) in Divandarreh County, Kurdistan Province, Iran. At the 2006 census, its population was 47,222, in 10,205 families.  The District has one city: Divandarreh. The District has three rural districts (dehestan): Chehel Cheshmeh Rural District, Howmeh Rural District, and Qaratureh Rural District.

References 

Divandarreh County
Districts of Kurdistan Province